This is a list of cardinals of the Catholic Church from England. It does not include cardinals of non-English national origin appointed to English ecclesiastical offices such as the cardinal protectors of England.

Dates in parentheses are the dates of elevation and death (or, in the case of Pope Adrian IV, the date of his election as pope). Cardinals of antipopes are listed in italics. Living cardinals are bolded.

Prior to the English Reformation, most English cardinals were non-bishops or Archbishop of Canterbury. Four were Archbishop of York. Since the re-establishment of the hierarchy of Roman Catholicism in England and Wales by Universalis Ecclesiae (1850), most have also been the Archbishop of Westminster. Every archbishop of Westminster has been created cardinal. The current archbishop of Westminster, Vincent Nichols, was elevated to the cardinalate on 22 February 2014 by Pope Francis in Rome.

12th century
Robert Pullen (1144–1146)
Nicholas Breakspeare, elected Pope Adrian IV (1149–1154)

13th century
Stephen Langton (1206–1228)
Robert of Courçon (1212–1219)
Robert Somercotes (1238–1241)
John of Toledo (1244–1275)
Robert Kilwardby (1278–1279)
Hugh of Evesham (1281–1287)

14th century
William of Macclesfield (1303), probably died before his promotion
Walter of Winterburn (1304–1305)
Thomas of Jorz (1305–1310)
John of Thoresby (1361–1373)
Simon Langham (1368–1376)
William Courtenay (1378) elevated by Pope Urban VI, but declined 
Adam Easton (1381–1385 and again 1389–1397)

15th century
Philip Repyngdon, elevated by Gregory XII in 1408 but declined the promotion
Robert Hallam, elevated in 1411 by Antipope John XXIII but declined the promotion
Thomas Langley, elevated in 1411 by Antipope John XXIII but declined the promotion
Henry Beaufort (1426–1447)
John Kemp (1439–1454)
Thomas Bourchier (1467/73-1486)
John Morton (1493–1500)

16th century
Christopher Bainbridge (1511–1514)
Thomas Wolsey (1515–1530)
John Fisher (1535–1535)
Reginald Pole (1536–1558)
William Petow (1557–1559)
William Allen (1587–1594)

17th century
Philip Howard (1675–1694)

18th century
Henry Benedict Stuart (1747–1807)

19th century
Thomas Weld (1830–1837)
Charles Januarius Acton (1842–1847)
Nicholas Wiseman (1850–1865)
Henry Edward Manning (1875–1892)
Edward Henry Howard (1877–1892)
John Henry Newman (1879–1890)
Herbert Vaughan (1893–1903)

20th century
Francis Bourne (1911–1935)
Francis Aidan Gasquet (1914–1929)
Arthur Hinsley (1937–1943)
Bernard Griffin (1946–1956)
William Godfrey (1958–1963)
William Theodore Heard (1959–1973)
John Carmel Heenan (1965–1975)
Basil Hume (1976–1999)

21st century
Cormac Murphy-O'Connor (2001–2017)
Vincent Nichols (2014–present)
Michael Fitzgerald  (2019–present)
 Arthur Roche (2022–present)

References

 
Cardinals
England
Cardinals